David Stevenson  is a British historian specialising in the period of the First World War. He is Stevenson Professor of International History at the London School of Economics and Political Science (LSE).

Academic career
Stevenson studied for his undergraduate degree at the University of Cambridge, before receiving a Ph.D. from the same university. He became a Lecturer at the LSE in 1982. In 1998, he was appointed Professor of International History. Between 2004 and 2005, he also received a Leverhulme Research Fellowship "for research on supply and logistics in 1914-1918"

His most recent books are: With Our Backs to the Wall: Victory and Defeat in 1918, released by Penguin (in the UK) and Belknap Press and 1917: War, Peace and Revolution, published by OUP.

Personal life
Stevenson is married and lives in Essex. He is President of both the London Central Branch of the Historical Association and the Loughton and District Historical Society and is one of the founding members of the annual Loughton Festival.

Bibliography 
 Stevenson, D., French War Aims against Germany, 1914-1919, 1982 (Oxford University Press) , 
 Stevenson, D., The First World War and International Politics, 1988 (Oxford University Press) , 
 Stevenson, D., Armaments and the Coming of War: Europe, 1904-1914, 1996 (Oxford University Press) , 
 Stevenson, D., The Outbreak of the First World War: 1914 in Perspective, 1997 (Macmillan) , 
 Stevenson, D., 1914-1918: the History of the First World War, 2004 (Penguin Press), also published as Cataclysm: the First World War as Political Tragedy (by Basic Books, USA) , 
 La Grande Guerra: Una Storia Globale (by Rizzoli, Italy)
 Der Erste Weltkrieg (by Artemis and Winkler, Germany)
 Stevenson, D., With Our Backs to the Wall: Victory and Defeat in 1918, 2011 (Penguin Books, Harvard University Press) , 
 Stevenson, D., 1917. War, Peace, and Revolution 2017 (Oxford University Press) 

Podcast
David Stevenson (Pritzker Military Museum & Library)

References

External links
 Interview on With Our Backs to the Wall at the Pritzker Military Library

1954 births
Living people
Historians of World War I
Academics of the London School of Economics
British military historians
Alumni of the University of Cambridge
20th-century British writers
21st-century British writers
20th-century British historians
21st-century British historians